Station agent may refer to:
The person in charge of a railway station, also called the station master.
Stock and station agent, who provides a support service to the agricultural community, particularly in Australia and New Zealand.
The Station Agent, a 2003 American comedy-drama film.